Secret Circle may refer to:

The Secret Circle, a trilogy of novels by L.J. Smith
The Secret Circle (TV series), based on the novels
Secret Circle (horse), a Thoroughbred racehorse
Secret Circle (group), a hip hop group formed in 2016